Agoura High School is a public high school in Agoura Hills, California, United States. It is the largest high school in the Las Virgenes Unified School District.

Athletics and activities
Agoura High School's athletic teams are nicknamed the Chargers. The school competes in the Marmonte League of the CIF Southern Section. From 2018 to 2020, Agoura was in the Coastal Canyon League.

Agoura High School has a music program that consists of two orchestras, three wind ensembles, four jazz bands, two choirs, and a marching band, and more than 60 activities and clubs for community service, honors societies, politics, religion, sports, academics, fashion, and dance.
Their visual and performing arts program has classes in film, theater, ceramics, and fine art. The on campus Performing Arts and Education Center is home to their theater performances, music concerts, and ComedySportz games (now Agoura Improv).

Curriculum
In 2009, Agoura High School introduced the International Baccalaureate program to its curriculum. They offer many Advanced Placement classes. They also have P.E.

Notable alumni 

 Justin Berfield, actor known for Malcolm in the Middle
 Rob Bourdon, cofounder of the band Linkin Park
 Johnathan Cabral, track athlete
 Adrianna Costa, television personality
 Noah Centineo, actor
 Jensen Daggett, actress
 Tara Davis, track athlete
 Brad Delson (born 1977), musician and record producer; lead guitarist and cofounder of the band Linkin Park
 Kerry Ehrin, screenwriter and producer 
 Doug Emhoff, entertainment lawyer, Second Gentleman of the United States and husband of U.S. Vice President Kamala Harris
 Chelsey Goldberg (born 1993), ice hockey player
 Heather Graham, actress
 A.J. Holmes, Broadway actor
 Deena Kastor (born 1973), runner; American record holder for marathon and half marathon.
 Hayley Kiyoko, actress/musician
 Jonathan Lipnicki (born 1990), actor
 Clay Matthews III, NFL player for the Green Bay Packers and Los Angeles Rams
 Matthew Mercer, voice actor and dungeon master on Critical Role
 Olivia Olson, singer, songwriter, actress and voice of Marceline on Adventure Time
 Kario Salem, television, film, and stage actor and screenwriter
 Mike Shinoda, cofounder of the band Linkin Park
 Dave Siegler (born 1961), professional tennis player
 Shane Stanley, film producer/director
 Todd Steussie, NFL player for the Minnesota Vikings, Carolina Panthers, Tampa Bay Buccaneers, and St. Louis Rams
 Robert Stock (born 1989), MLB baseball pitcher

References

External links 
 Official Agoura High School website

Agoura Hills, California
High schools in Los Angeles County, California
Public high schools in California
International Baccalaureate schools in California
1964 establishments in California